The Pacific Coast Railroad is a  narrow gauge tourist railroad located at the Santa Margarita Ranch in Santa Margarita, California.

Established in 2000 and completed in 2004 by San Luis Obispo entrepreneur Rob Rossi, the railroad sees only limited public operation. Phase 1 consisted of a  loop around the most historic part of the ranch. The railroad currently operates three steam locomotives built between 1897 and 1968, and four of the original Santa Fe & Disneyland Railroad Retlaw 1 passenger cars. One of the locomotives, the No. 2 Roger Linn, was used in the Dr. Quinn, Medicine Woman TV show. Other equipment includes an ex-International Railways of Central America caboose, business car Cuscatlan, and several ex-Denver & Rio Grande freight cars.

See also
List of heritage railroads in the United States
Los Angeles Live Steamers Railroad Museum
Rail transport in Walt Disney Parks and Resorts

References

External links
Pacific Coast Railroad Company blog
Santa Margarita Ranch official website

3 ft gauge railways in the United States
Amusement rides based on rail transport
Heritage railroads in California
Tourist attractions in San Luis Obispo County, California
Transportation in San Luis Obispo County, California
2000 establishments in California